Sidney "Cy" Strulovitch (20 June 1925 – 11 June 2020) was a Canadian basketball player who competed in the 1948 Summer Olympics. He was born in Côte Saint-Luc, Quebec.

References

1925 births
2020 deaths
Basketball people from Quebec
Basketball players at the 1948 Summer Olympics
Canadian men's basketball players
Olympic basketball players of Canada
People from Côte Saint-Luc